The 2014 European Artistic Gymnastics Championships can refer to either or both of the following:

 The 30th European Women's Artistic Gymnastics Championships (May 12–18, 2014)
 The 31st European Men's Artistic Gymnastics Championships (May 19–25, 2014)

European Artistic Gymnastics Championships